Sandipan Chanda (born 13 August 1983) is a chess Grandmaster hailing from the city of Kolkata (Calcutta) in the Indian state of West Bengal. He started playing and Sandipan became grandmaster in 2003. In 2004 he won the Curaçao Chess Festival with 7.5/9, a half point ahead of Alexander Shabalov. 

Sandipan started playing chess at the age of 9, he got interested in chess and saw people play on the streets of Kolkata. He learnt chess through his first coach Late Paritosh Bhattacharya who taught him the rules of chess. He played for India in the Chess Olympiads of 2004, 2006 and 2008. He scored a notable win over Sergei Tiviakov in 2007 at a tournament in Ottawa playing as White, which was selected for inclusion in John Nunn's The Mammoth Book of the World's Greatest Chess Games.
He was Viswanathan Anand's second for the World Chess Championship 2013 match.

In 2016 and 2017 he won the Open Dutch Chess Championship.

References

External links

Rating data
His online chess games and profile on Chess Live

Living people
Chess grandmasters
Chess Olympiad competitors
Indian chess players
1983 births